Gjenfortellinger with Pitsj is a jazz a cappella album. It was released in 2009 on Grappa Music (GRCD 4317).

Track listing 
 «Fanteguten» (4:07) (Trad / Arr.: Sverre Indris Joner)
 «Skjøre / Fragile» (3:27) (Sting /Norsk lyrics: Kjell Inge Torgersen / Arr.: Pitsj)
 «Her igjen / Outra vez» (3:37) (Antonio Carlos Jobim / Norsk lyrics: Lars Lillo-Stenberg / Arr.: Ane Carmen Roggen)
 «Den andre kvinnen / The other woman» (3:21) (Jessie Mae Robinson / Norwegian lyrics: Anja Eline Skybakmoen & Ida Roggen / Arr.: Anja Eline Skybakmoen)
 «Lerkefugl / Ladybird» (3:07) (Ted Dameron / Norsk lyrics: Eilev Groven Myhren & Ida Roggen / Arr.: Helge Sunde)
 «Sofistikerte frøken / Sophisticated lady» (3:32) (Mitchell Parish/Duke Ellington/Irving Mills / Norwegian lyrics: Tora Augestad / Arr.: Eyolf Dale)
 «Det var en gang / Long ago and far away» (3:23) (James Taylor / Norwegian lyrics: Kjell Inge Torgersen / Arr.: Anine Kruse Skatrud)
 «Sjå der kor ho flyr / The moon is a harsh mistress» (4:01) (Jimmy Webb / Norwegian lyrics: Kjell Inge Torgersen / Arr.: Ane Carmen Roggen)
 «Forventning» (3:04) (Hege Øygaren/Vigleik Storaas / Arr.: Wenche Losnegård)
 «Besatt, blendet og besnæret / Bewitched, bothered and bewildered» (5:03) (Lorenz Hart/Richard Rodgers / Norwegian lyrics: Ida Roggen & Toni Herlofson / Arr.: Bjørn Kruse)
 «Verden av i går / Ordinary world» (4:29) (Duran Duran / Norwegian lyrics: Ida Roggen / Arr.: Lars Andreas Aspesæter)
 «Bruremarsj fra Sørfold» (3:53) (Trad. / Arr.: Marius Løken)

Credits 
Vocals: Anine Kruse, Benedikte Kruse, Ane Carmen Roggen, Ida Roggen and Anja Eline Skybakmoen
Producer: Morten Halle
Art direction: Anorak
Sound engineer: Vidar Lunden
Mastering: Giert Clausen
Mixing: Morten Halle, Vidar Lunden
Cover photo: Steffen Aarberg Aaland

Notes 
Recorded at Musikkloftet in May and June 2009
Mastered at Fersk Lyd

References

External links 
 Pitsj Official Website

Pitsj albums
2009 albums
2009 in music